The 1890 Colorado Silver and Gold football team was an American football team that represented the University of Colorado as an independent during the 1890 college football season. The team was the first team to represent the University of Colorado. Colorado has no head coach and compiled a record of 0–4.

Schedule

References

Colorado
Colorado Buffaloes football seasons
College football winless seasons
Colorado Silver and Gold football